Wara (Ouara, Ouala) is an alternative name for either of these two Gur languages of Burkina Faso:
 Samwe language
 Paleni language

Wára may refer to:
 Upper Morehead language, a Trans-Fly language of Papua New-Guinea